George William Croft (December 20, 1846 – March 10, 1904) was a U.S. Representative from South Carolina, father of Theodore Gaillard Croft.

Born in Newberry County, South Carolina, Croft attended the common schools in Greenville, South Carolina. He entered the South Carolina Military Academy at Charleston in 1863. Along with all the other cadets at the Citadel, he was mustered into the Confederate States Army in 1864 and served until the close of the Civil War.

He attended the University of Virginia at Charlottesville in 1866 and 1867, where he studied law. He was admitted to the bar in 1869 and commenced practice in Aiken, South Carolina, in 1870. He served as president of the State bar association.

He served as member of the State House of Representatives from 1882–1883 and 1901–1902. He served in the State Senate in 1880.

Croft was elected as a Democrat to the Fifty-eighth Congress and served from March 4, 1903, until his death from a splinter in Washington, D.C., on March 10, 1904. While serving in Congress, he proposed the idea of building a post office in downtown Aiken. Upon his death, his son Theodore G. Croft was elected to finish his father's term in Congress. His son carried on the idea of building the post office.
He was interred in St. Thaddeus' Episcopal Churchyard, Aiken, South Carolina.

See also
List of United States Congress members who died in office (1900–49)

Sources

 George W. Croft, late a representative from South Carolina, Memorial addresses delivered in the House of Representatives and Senate frontispiece 1905

1846 births
1904 deaths
Confederate States Army personnel
Democratic Party South Carolina state senators
Democratic Party members of the South Carolina House of Representatives
Democratic Party members of the United States House of Representatives from South Carolina
19th-century American politicians
People from Newberry County, South Carolina
People from Aiken, South Carolina
Deaths from sepsis